Urok may refer to:
 Urok, Poland, a neighbourhood of Szczecin, Poland
 Urok Islands, an island group within the Bissagos Archipelago, Guinea-Bissau, which includes the island of Formosa
 Urok (film), a 2014 Bulgarian film

See also 
 Uruk (disambiguation)
 Orok (disambiguation)
 Oruk